Al-Ahly Women's Handball team was founded in the 1950s as one of the first Egyptian women's Handball disciplines. The Club plays on its official home ground arena, Al Ahly Sports Hall.

 Al-Ahly Women's Handball team holds many records nationally. It is the most crowned team in the League with 34 titles and 30 Egyptian cup records, and internationally, the only team to achieve such high achievements.

Honours

National titles 

 Egyptian Handball League 42 (Record):
   Champions : 1961–62, 1968-69, 1969–70, 1970-71, 1971-72, 1972–73, 1973–74, 1974–75,1975-76, 1976-1977,1977–1978 , 1979–80, 1988–89, 1989–90, 1991–92, 1992–93, 1994–95, 1995–96, 1996–97, 1997–98, 1998–99, 1999–00, 2000–01, 2001–02, 2002–03, 2003–04, 2004–05, 2005–06, 2006–07, 2007–08, 2008–09, 2009–10, 2010–11, 2011–12, 2012–13, 2013–14, 2014–15, 2015–16, 2016–17, 2017–18, 2018-19, 2020-21.

 Egyptian Handball Cup 33 (Record):
   Champions : 1985–86, 1986–87, 1988–89, 1989–90, 1990–91, 1991–92, 1992–93, 1993–94, 1994–95, 1995–96, 1997–98, 1999–00, 2000–01, 2001–02, 2002–03, 2003–04, 2004–05, 2005–06, 2006–07, 2007–08, 2008–09, 2009–10, 2010–11, 2011–12, 2012–13, 2013–14, 2014–15, 2015–16, 2016–17, 2017–18,2018-19, 2020-21
 Egyptian Handball ٍSuper Cup 3 (Record):
   Champions : 2014–15, 2016–17. 2018-19

International titles 
 African Women's Handball Champions League 1 :

 Champions : 1979

Sports Hall information
 

Name: – Al Ahly Sports Hall
City: – Cairo
Capacity: – 2500

Current squad
Squad for the 2018–19 season

Goalkeepers
  Ghada Hossam
  Amina Khaled 
  Hend Ashraf
Right Wingers
  Sara Elkholey
  Amina Attef
Left Wingers
  Mai Hesham
  Yara Shehata
Line players
  Nour Ahmed
  Yasmine Abdelrahim

Left Backs 	
  Menna Khaled
  Sara Hossam
Central Backs
  Nasra Eid
  Israa Sayed
  Yasmine Waheed
  Shimaa Emad Eldeen
Right Backs
  Nourhan Gamal
  Doaa Helmy

Technical and managerial staff

Kit manufacturers and shirt sponsors

Club Presidents

See also
 Al Ahly FC
 Al Ahly (volleyball)
 Al Ahly Women's Volleyball
 Al Ahly (basketball)
 Al Ahly Women's Basketball
 Al Ahly (handball)
 Al Ahly Women's Handball
 Al Ahly (table tennis)
 Al Ahly (water polo)
 Port Said Stadium riot
 Al-Ahly TV

References 

H
Egyptian handball clubs